Frederick Arthur "Dutch" Lamlein (August 14, 1887 – September 20, 1970) was a pitcher in Major League Baseball. He played for the Chicago White Sox and St. Louis Cardinals.
Lamlein was often misspelled "Lamline" on baseball cards, programs, and newspaper print items throughout his minor and major league careers.
Lamlein is also credited with moving the North American Silverstick Championship Finals youth hockey tournament to his hometown in Port Huron, MI in 1963.  To this day, Port Huron is still the site of this annual tournament which brings the top youth travel hockey teams from all over North America to compete for the Silverstick award.

External links

1887 births
1970 deaths
Major League Baseball pitchers
Chicago White Sox players
St. Louis Cardinals players
Baseball players from Michigan
People from Port Huron, Michigan
Sportspeople from Metro Detroit
Saginaw Wa-was players
Portland Pippins players
Portland Beavers players
Portland Colts players
Dubuque Dubs players
Freeport Commons players
Rockford Wakes players